West York Area School District is a midsized, suburban public school district located in York County in South Central Pennsylvania, United States. The West York Area School District includes West York Borough and West Manchester Township. According to 2000 federal census data, it served a resident population of 21,356. By 2010, the District's population grew to 23,664 people. In 2009, the District residents’ per capita income was $21,915, while the median family income was $52,309. In the Commonwealth, the median family income was $49,501 and the United States median family income was $49,445, in 2010.

Schools in the district are:
 West York Area High School (Grades 9–12)
 West York Area Middle School (Grades 6–8)
 Lincolnway Elementary School (Grades 2–3)
 Wallace Elementary (Grades K–1)
 Norman A. Trimmer Elementary (Grades 4–5)

Extracurriculars
West York School District's students have access to a variety of clubs, activities and an extensive sports program.

Sports
The District funds:

Boys
Baseball - AAA
Basketball- AAA
Cross Country - AAA
Football - AAA
Golf - AAA
Lacrosse - AAAA
Soccer - AAA
Swimming and Diving - AA
Tennis - AAA
Track and Field - AAA
Volleyball - AA
Wrestling - AAA

Girls
Basketball - AAA
Cross Country - AA
Field Hockey - AA
Golf - AAA
Lacrosse - AAAA
Soccer (Fall) - AA
Softball - AAA
Swimming and Diving - AA
Girls' Tennis - AAA
Track and Field - AA
Volleyball - AA

Middle School Sports

Boys
Basketball
Cross Country
Football
Soccer
Track and Field
Wrestling	

Girls
Basketball
Cross Country
Field Hockey
Softball (Fall)
Track and Field
Volleyball

According to PIAA directory July 2012

References

External links

School districts in York County, Pennsylvania